Leksands Idrottsförening Dam or Leksands IF Dam are a professional ice hockey team in the Swedish Women's Hockey League (SDHL). They play in Leksand, a town in the western-central Swedish province of Dalarna, at the Tegera Arena. Until 2021, the organisation ran a second women's side, called Leksands IF Dam 2, which competed in the Damettan Västra.

History   
The women's section of Leksands IF was founded in 1998. The 2008 season saw a leap in success for the club, as it earned promotion to the Riksserien, and saw Cecilia Östberg and Klara Myrén become the first two Leksands players to represent the Swedish national women's team. In 2012, the club finished in 7th place, and was forced to compete in the relegation playoffs, but managed to keep its place in the SDHL.

In 2016, the club hired former Leksands men's youth player Alexander Bröms as head coach for the women's side, despite him having no previous coaching experience. He would hold the role until his departure in 2018 to coach the women's national under-18 team.

In 2017, multiple Leksands players publicly voiced dissatisfaction at the way the organisation was treating the women's side, including the fact that women's players received no salary and were being forced to clean up the arena's stands after men's games. Despite club chairperson Åke Nordström promising to improve conditions, after six months the players had only been provided with some exercise gear and a team-branded training bag.

In April 2018, Leksands goaltender Leon Reuterström publicly came out as transgender, and retired from the SDHL to pursue his medical transition. Later that summer, long-time club forward and third-leading scorer in club history, Iveta Koka, left the club to sign with AIK IF. Despite losing Koka, the club made several big signings ahead of the 2018–19 season, including Swedish international Anna Borgqvist and Canadian Danielle Stone. After beginning the season with a 9–0 victory over SDE Hockey, Leksands finished in 4th place in the SDHL, the second best result in club history. The club still failed to make it past the playoff quarterfinals, however, and both Borgqvist and Stone left the club after just one year. Long time defender and second-highest all-time in games played for the club Sofia Engström left the Leksands that summer as well, after the club had gone months without offering any players (nor the head coach) a contract extension following the team's elimination in the playoffs. The club dropped to 8th place in the 2019–20 SDHL season.

Players and personnel

2022–23 roster 

 

 

Coaching staff and team personnel
 Head coach: Jordan Colliton
 Assistant coach: Hans Lodin
 Goaltending coach: Filip Myrskog
 Conditioning coach: Christin Hero
 Equipment managers: Kent Arvidsson & Ida Munter Venell
 Physical therapist: Christin Hero

Team captaincy history 
 Sofia Engström, 2008–2014
 Elin Lundberg, 2014–2019
 Hanna Sköld, 2019–2022
 Abby Thiessen, 2022–

Head coaches 
 Daniel Ljung, 2007–08
 Ulf Hedberg, 2008–2011
 Magnus Svensson, 2011–12
 Christer Siik, 2012–2014
 Jens Nielsen, 2014–15
 Christer Sjöberg, 2015–16
 Alexander Bröms, 2016–2018
 Ulf Hedberg, 2018–19
 Lars Stanmark, 2019–2021
 Mathias Olsson, 2021–22
 Jordan Colliton, 2022–

Season-by-season results 
''This is a partial list of the most recent seasons completed by Leksands. Code explanation; GP—Games played, W—Wins, L—Losses, T—Tied games, GF—Goals for, GA—Goals against, Pts—Points. Top Scorer: Points (Goals+Assists)

Franchise records and leaders

All-time scoring leaders 
The top-ten point-scorers (goals + assists) of Leksands IF through the 2020–21 season.

Note: Nat = Nationality; Pos = Position; GP = Games played; G = Goals; A = Assists; Pts = Points; P/G = Points per game;  = 2021–22 Leksands player

References

External links 

 
 Team information and statistics from Eliteprospects.com

Swedish Women's Hockey League teams
Ice hockey teams in Sweden
Women's ice hockey teams in Europe
Ice hockey teams in Dalarna County
Ice hockey clubs established in 1998
Women's ice hockey in Sweden